Petrişor Toderaşc (born 15 July 1980 in Iași) is Romanian former rugby union footballer who played as a prop.

Toderaşc played in France for Oyonnax (2004/05), CA Brive (2005/10) and Stade Rochelais (2010/13).

He has 50 caps for Romania, with 8 tries and 40 points scored, since his first match, a 37-17 loss to Italy, at 18 November 2000. He represented Romania twice at the Rugby World Cup finals, playing four matches in 2003, where he scored a try in the 90-8 loss to Australia, and two in 2007. His most recent match for the "Oaks" was at the 42-0 loss to Scotland, at 18 September 2007, at the Rugby World Cup finals. Toderaşc was absent from his National Team until 28 November 2009, playing as a replacement in the 18-29 loss do Fiji, in a friendly match, in Bucharest.

External links
Petrişor Toderaşc International Statistics

1980 births
Living people
Sportspeople from Iași
Romanian rugby union players
Rugby union props
RCJ Farul Constanța players
Oyonnax Rugby players
CA Brive players
Stade Rochelais players
Expatriate rugby union players in France
Romania international rugby union players
Romanian expatriate rugby union players
Romanian expatriate sportspeople in France